Radian Group Inc. is a mortgage insurance company with a suite of mortgage, risk, real estate, and title services.

The company is headquartered at Centre Square in Philadelphia.

Radian Companies

Radian is a group of separately capitalized companies that share a unified strategic focus. Radian's core business, Radian Guaranty Inc., provides private mortgage insurance to protect lenders from default-related losses, facilitate the sale of low-down-payment mortgages in the secondary market and enable homebuyers to purchase homes with down-payments less than 20%. In 2019 it had a  net income of $672.3 million. Vanguard Group Inc, FMR LLC, Blackrock Inc are some of the highest stock holders of Radian Group Inc.

References

External links
 Radian corporate website

Financial services companies established in 1977
Companies listed on the New York Stock Exchange
Financial services companies of the United States
Companies based in Philadelphia